Neil Murray Tosh (born 1 September 1950) is a retired Scottish Conservative Party politician who served as a Member of the Scottish Parliament (MSP) for the South of Scotland region (1999–2003) and the West of Scotland region (2003–07).

Early life and career 
Born in Ayr, Tosh was educated at Kilmarnock Academy and the University of Glasgow, where he graduated with a second-class honours degree. He trained as a schoolteacher at Jordanhill College in Glasgow, and for nearly 25 years taught history at several schools in Ayrshire. Before being elected to the Scottish Parliament he was head of the history department at Belmont Academy in Ayr.

Political career 
Tosh contested Ayr at the October 1974 general election as a Liberal, and Glasgow Hillhead at the 1983 general election for the Conservatives. From 1987 to 1996, he represented Troon South-West ward on the former Kyle and Carrick District Council, where he rose to become deputy leader of the Conservative group.

At the inaugural election for the Scottish Parliament in 1999, Tosh stood as the Conservative candidate for Cunninghame South, where he came third; instead, he was elected to Holyrood as one of four candidates on the party's South of Scotland regional list. Regarded as being on the Conservative left, he was convener of the Procedures Committee during his first term in parliament. In 2001 he announced his intention to stand down at the next election so that he could return to local government, amidst speculation that he was unhappy about the selection of right-winger Iain Duncan Smith as national party leader. 

However, he unexpectedly won the race to become a Deputy Presiding Officer that same year, defeating Cathy Peattie by 68 votes to 45, which led him to reverse his earlier decision to leave Holyrood. Press reports attributed his victory to the heavy-handed attempts by the Labour Party leader, Jack McConnell, to force his MSPs to support Peattie en masse, which prompted a backlash from several of them and public allegations of 'cronyism'.

Tosh remained a Deputy Presiding Officer for the next six years, until the end of the second parliament in 2007. In that year's elections, he was the Conservative candidate for Dumfries, where he was defeated by Elaine Murray, the Labour incumbent. Having been placed a lowly fourth in the party's South of Scotland regional list, he therefore did not return to Holyrood as an MSP for the 2007–2011 session.

Later years 
In 2011, Tosh was one of those who backed Ruth Davidson's bid to become leader of the Scottish Conservative Party, describing her as a "breath of fresh air in Scottish politics".

In 2016, the representatives of the IndyCamp protesters stated that Tosh may own the Scottish Parliament building. This claim was dismissed by the lawyer for the Scottish Parliament.

References

External links 
 
 Murray Tosh MSP profile at the site of the Conservative Party

1950 births
Living people
People from Ayr
Conservative MSPs
Scottish Conservative Party councillors
Members of the Scottish Parliament 1999–2003
Members of the Scottish Parliament 2003–2007
Deputy Presiding Officers of the Scottish Parliament
Scottish Liberal Party parliamentary candidates